Littlefield High School is a public high school located in the city of Littlefield, Texas, USA and classified as a 3A school by the UIL.  It is a part of the Littlefield Independent School District located in south central Lamb County.   In 2015, the school was rated "Met Standard" by the Texas Education Agency.

History
The school sought to be accredited by the Southern Association of High Schools and Colleges, and the Littlefield ISD board of trustees approved of the high school's application in 1952.

Athletics
The Littlefield Wildcats compete in these sports 

Volleyball, Cross Country, Football, Basketball, Golf, Tennis, Track, Baseball & Softball

State titles
Football 
1949(1A)

Notable alumni
Billy Howton (born 1930), (class of 1948), NFL player for the Green Bay Packers, the Cleveland Browns, and the Dallas Cowboys. 
Waylon Jennings (June 15, 1937 – February 13, 2002), (dropped out, scheduled for class of 1955), was an American singer, songwriter, musician, and actor.

References

External links
Littlefield ISD website

Public high schools in Texas
Schools in Lamb County, Texas